Michael John Clifford Taylor (24 April 1934 – 4 April 2017) was a British racing driver.  He participated in two Formula One World Championship Grands Prix, debuting on 18 July 1959.  He scored no championship points. He also participated in several non-Championship Formula One races.
He was thrown from the car, cutting down a tree with his body and broke several bones (Alan Stacey and Chris Bristow were killed and Stirling Moss was also injured at the event, crashing his Lotus 18 in practice). He was paralysed, but after therapy was able to regain the ability to walk.

Because of his car failure Taylor later sued Lotus successfully, one of the few successful actions against the makers of a racing car.

After his accident, Taylor sporadically competed in long distance rallying, finishing third in the London–Sydney Marathon in 1977 in a Citroën CX with Paddy Hopkirk and Bob Riley. Taylor also had a career in property speculation. He died on 4 April 2017 after a battle with cancer.

Complete Formula One World Championship results 
(key)

Sources

Profile at www.grandprix.com

English racing drivers
English Formula One drivers
1934 births
2017 deaths
24 Hours of Le Mans drivers
World Sportscar Championship drivers
Formula One team owners